Uruzgan University is a public university in Tarinkot, capital of southern Uruzgan province of Afghanistan. It was officially inaugurated on March 28, 2012.

Uruzgan University currently has faculties of education and agriculture. The people of Uruzgan, Parliament members, and the provincial governor are trying to establish further faculties. There are large numbers of students who are willing to study in Uruzgan province rather than go to any other province of Afghanistan.

References

External links 
 Afghanistan Ministry of Higher Education

Universities in Afghanistan
Urozgan Province
2012 establishments in Afghanistan
Educational institutions established in 2012